The University of Delaware Botanic Gardens are botanical gardens and an arboretum located on the campus of the University of Delaware, in Newark, Delaware, United States. The gardens are open to the public without charge.

The original garden in front of Townsend Hall was established with a donation from Emily Clark Diffenback in the mid-1960s, and has been named Clark Garden in her honor. It has since been designated a test arboretum by the American Holly Society. Other gardens include a Magnolia Society test garden south of Townsend Hall; native and non-native plants north of Worrilow Hall; a wildflower area in front of the Fischer Greenhouse Laboratory; a herbaceous perennial garden behind another greenhouse; and stretches of native trees and shrubs lining the driveway and grounds.

List of tree and shrub species in collection

A
 Abelia x grandiflora
 Abeliophyllum distichum
 Abies firma
 Abies homolepis
 Abies koreana
 Abies pinsapo
 Acer buergerianum
 Acer campestre
 Acer ginnala
 Acer griseum
 Acer negundo
 Acer palmatum
 Acer pensylvanicum
 Acer platanoides
 Acer rubrum
 Acer saccharinum
 Acer saccharum
 Acer triflorum
 Aesculus hippocastanum
 Aesculus pavia
 Alnus glutinosa
 Aralia spinosa
 Aronia arbutifolia
 Asimina triloba

B
 Berberis julianae
 Berberis thunbergii
 Berberis verruculosa
 Betula lenta
 Betula maximowiczii
 Betula nigra
 Betula papyrifera
 Betula pendula

C
 Calycanthus floridus
 Camellia japonica
 Camellia sinensis
 Carpinus betulus
 Carpinus caroliniana
 Carya tomentosa
 Castanea mollissima
 Catalpa bignonioides
 Catalpa speciosa
 Cedrus atlantica
 Cedrus deodara
 Cedrus libani
 Celtis occidentalis
 Cephalotaxus harringtonii
 Cercidiphyllum japonicum
 Chamaecyparis lawsoniana
 Chamaecyparis thyoides
 Chimonanthus praecox
 Cladrastis kentukea
 Clethra acuminata
 Clethra alnifolia
 Cornus alternifolia
 Cornus mas
 Cornus sericea ("Red Osier Dogwood")
 Corylopsis glabrescens
 Corylopsis pauciflora
 Cotinus coggygria
 Cryptomeria japonica
 Cunninghamia lanceolata
 Cupressus glabra

D
 Daphne caucasica
 Daphne cneorum
 Daphne genkwa
 Daphne odora
 Daphniphyllum humile
 Daphniphyllum macropodum
 Diospyros virginiana

E
 Elaeagnus umbellata
 Euonymus alatus

F
 Fagus grandifolia
 Fagus sylvatica
 Forsythia viridissima ("Broxensis")
 Forsythia × intermedia
 Fothergilla gardenii
 Fraxinus americana
 Fraxinus pennsylvanica

G
 Ginkgo biloba

H
 Hamamelis virginiana ("Witch-hazel")
 Hamamelis × intermedia
 Hibiscus syriacus
 Hovenia dulcis
 Hydrangea macrophylla
 Hydrangea quercifolia
 Hypericum ("Hidcote")

I
 Ilex cassine
 Ilex cornuta
 Ilex latifolia
 Ilex vomitoria
 Ilex × attenuata
 Ilex × koehneana
 Illicium anisatum
 Illicium floridanum
 Illicium henryi
 Illicium parviflorum
 Itea chinensis

J
 Jasminum nudiflorum
 Juglans nigra
 Juniperus communis
 Juniperus deppeana
 Juniperus rigida
 Juniperus scopulorum

L
 Lagerstroemia indica
 Larix decidua
 Lindera benzoin
 Liquidambar styraciflua
 Lonicera pileata
 Lonicera sempervirens
 Loropetalum chinense

M
 Magnolia 'Elizabeth'
 Magnolia 'Raspberry Ice'
 Magnolia grandiflora
 Magnolia sieboldii
 Magnolia soulangeana
 Magnolia stellata
 Mahonia japonica
 Metasequoia glyptostroboides
 Myrica pensylvanica

N
 Nyssa sylvatica

O
 Osmanthus fragrans
 Osmanthus heterophyllus ("Argentio-Marginata")
 Osmanthus × fortunei
 Ostrya virginiana
 Oxydendrum arboreum

P
 Phellodendron amurense
 Photinia × fraseri
 Picea abies
 Picea glauca
 Picea pungens
 Pinus aristata
 Pinus ayacahuite
 Pinus bungeana
 Pinus cembra
 Pinus densiflora
 Pinus flexilis
 Pinus heldreichii
 Pinus koraiensis
 Pinus mugo
 Pinus nigra
 Pinus palustris
 Pinus pumila
 Pinus resinosa
 Pinus strobiformis
 Pinus strobus
 Pinus sylvestris
 Pinus taeda
 Pinus thunbergii
 Pinus virginiana
 Pinus wallichiana
 Platanus × hispanica
 Platycladus orientalis
 Prunus laurocerasus
 Pseudolarix amabilis
 Pseudotsuga menziesii
 Pyracantha coccinea

Q
 Quercus acutissima
 Quercus alba
 Quercus aliena
 Quercus imbricaria
 Quercus macrocarpa
 Quercus palustris
 Quercus phellos
 Quercus robur
 Quercus rubra

R
 Rhapidophyllum hystrix
 Rhododendron "PJM"
 Rhododendron canescens
 Rhododendron carolinianum
 Rhododendron catawbiense
 Rhododendron makinoi
 Rhododendron maximum 
 Rhododendron minus
 Rhododendron prunifolium
 Rhododendron schlippenbachii
 Rhododendron yakusimanum
 Rhus aromatica
 Rhus chinensis
 Rhus typhina

S
 Salix alba ("Tristis")
 Salix purpurea
 Sassafras albidum
 Sciadopitys verticillata
 Skimmia japonica
 Styrax japonicus
 Styrax obassia
 Symphoricarpos orbiculatus ("Coralberry")

T
 Taxodium ascendens
 Taxodium distichum
 Taxus baccata
 Taxus × media
 Tetradium daniellii
 Torreya nucifera
 Trochodendron aralioides
 Tsuga canadensis
 Tsuga caroliniana
 Tsuga diversifolia
 Tsuga sieboldii

V
 Viburnum carlesii
 Viburnum dilatatum
 Viburnum lentago
 Viburnum macrocephalum
 Viburnum plicatum
 Viburnum rhytidophyllum
 Viburnum setigerum
 Viburnum utile
 Viburnum × burkwoodii
 Viburnum × pragense
 Viburnum × rhytidophlloides

W
 Weigela Florida

Z
 Zelkova serrata
 Zenobia pulverulenta

See also 
 List of botanical gardens in the United States

External links
Official site

Botanical gardens in Delaware
University of Delaware
Protected areas of New Castle County, Delaware